

Circulatory system

Heart

Blood vessels

Other

Respiratory system

✱ The bronchioles have no sympathetic innervation, but are instead affected by circulating adrenaline

Visual system

Digestive system

Endocrine system

Urinary system

Reproductive system

Integumentary system

References

Autonomic nervous system
Biology-related lists